Kurchaloyevsky District (Kurçaloyn khoşt) is an administrative and municipal district (raion), one of the fifteen in the Chechen Republic, Russia. It is located in the east of the republic. Its administrative center is the a town of Kurchaloy. Population:  101,625 (2002 Census). The population of Kurchaloy accounts for 19.9% of the district's total population.

Healthcare
State health facilities are represented by one central district hospital in Kurchaloy and two district hospitals in Tsotsin-Yurt and Alleroy.

Ethnography and notable people
The district is home to Aleroj Teip (associated with the selo of Alleroy), and is a birthplace of both former Chechen president Aslan Maskhadov and former Minister of National Security Turpal-Ali Atgeriyev.

References

Notes

Sources

Districts of Chechnya